"" is the national anthem of North Macedonia; both the music and lyrics date from the early 1940s. Todor Skalovski composed the music, while the lyrics were written by Vlado Maleski. It was adopted as the national anthem in 1992, a year after the state's independence from Yugoslavia. Before its adoption as a national anthem, it was used as the regional anthem of the Socialist Republic of Macedonia, a constituent state of Yugoslavia, before it became the national anthem of the Republic of North Macedonia.

History

The lyrics of "Denes nad Makedonija" were penned by Vlado Maleski, a writer who was active in the Partisan movement during World War II. The musical portion was composed by Todor Skalovski. The song was first played in 1942, among groups affiliated with the communist and Partisan resistance in Struga. According to oral recounts, the hymn was played by Maleski himself on New Year's Eve in the presence of 24 youths, whose identities were subsequently documented in writing only in 1981. Even though the resistance consisted of fighters from the different ethnic groups across Yugoslavia, the aforementioned youths are believed to have all identified as Macedonians. From the end of the war, it was utilized – albeit unofficially – as the regional anthem of the Socialist Republic of Macedonia (which was part of Yugoslavia at the time) until 1989.

Meanwhile, during the Informbiro period, a small change was made in the lyrics. In the new version, the names of Nikola Karev and Dimitar Vlahov were scrapped and that of Dame Gruev was added. Karev's name was removed, as he and his brothers were suspected of being Bulgarophiles. Vlahov also was dismissed, because he came from the Bulgarian Communist Party, communicated much better in Bulgarian than in the newly codified Macedonian language, and had no political supporters in Macedonia. The initial idea of the communist elite to remove the name of Gotse Delchev too and not to include that of Dame Gruev, because of their Bulgarophile sentiments, was abandoned. On 14 April 1989, the socialist republic's Assembly amended the Constitution of 1974, expressly affirming "Denes nad Makedonija" as its official regional anthem. However, this change was short-lived, as the Assembly declared Macedonia's sovereignty two years later in January. This was approved on 8 September 1991 in a referendum that saw Macedonians vote overwhelmingly in favour of independence.

Soon after independence, the Macedonian national legislature held a contest to determine a national anthem for the state. "Denes nad Makedonija" was one of several candidates in contention – the others in the running were "Himna" by Taki Hrisik and "Da ni bideš večna" by Aleksandar Džambazov – and ended up finishing runner-up in the final results. Despite this, most of the Assembly Commission voted to make it the national anthem of the state, and it was duly adopted on 11 August 1992.

Legal protection
Macedonia's Sobranie (legislative chamber) passed legislation titled "The Law on the Anthem of the Republic of Macedonia" on 11 August 1992.  This officially adopted "Denes nad Makedonija" as the national anthem of the country, with Article 2 specifically confirming the song's status as such. However, it did not stipulate which stanzas should be recognized as official. The statute technically did not pass with the requisite two-thirds majority as stipulated by Article 5 of the country's constitution for proposals concerning national symbols. Although 88 out of the 120 members of the assembly voted for it, Albanian representatives were not involved.

Lyrics
"Denes nad Makedonija", as originally written, consists of four stanzas. North Macedonia's law does not exactly specify which stanzas officially constitute the national anthem. However, the second stanza is often omitted from the lyrics of the national anthem that are posted on North Macedonia's government websites.

The lyrics of "Denes nad Makedonija" are reflective of a military marching song, which is fitting given its connection to the Yugoslav Macedonian theatre of the Second World War. They are not a call to arms for Macedonians; instead, the hymn uses imagery to take the person singing it back to the time the anthem was written and purports that they themselves were engaging in combat at the time. The lyrics previously alluded to the concepts of mothers and motherhood (specifically in the second stanza). This is in line with the national anthems – both past and present – of other Southeast European countries like Bosnia and Herzegovina ("Jedna si jedina"), Croatia ("Horvatska domovina"), and Montenegro ("Oj, svijetla majska zoro"). It discussed how mothers mourn for their fallen sons, who died fighting for the rights and liberty of their country.  They are comforted for their loss by being reminded of the bravery of their sons and the nobleness of the cause for which they died. Although this theme has been described as a "standard anthemic device", it was subsequently expunged from the official words of the state anthem.

See also

March of the Macedonian Revolutionaries

Notes

References

External links

 Government of North Macedonia – North Macedonia's government website has a page about North Macedonia's national symbols such as the national anthem, including a vocal version 
 MP3 sound file (instrumental)
 Denes nad Makedonija (old version)

European anthems
Macedonian songs
Yugoslav Macedonia in World War II
National anthems
National anthem compositions in C major
National symbols of North Macedonia